The Labis incident took place during the Malayan Emergency in January 1950. British Gurkhas ambushed a group of communist guerillas five miles north of the Johore town of Labis. In the ensuring battle, 22 communists were killed and five wounded. It was described as the "first major success" by British security forces in the emergency.

References

Wars involving the United Kingdom
Malayan Emergency
January 1950 events in Asia
1950 in Malaya